Simpatico is an album by Suzy Bogguss and Chet Atkins, released in 1994.

History 
Atkins and Bogguss were nominated for the 1996 Grammy award for Best Country & Western Vocal Collaboration (for the song "All My Loving" on the Beatles tribute album Come Together: America Salutes The Beatles) but did not win.

They were also nominated for the 1995 CMA Vocal Event of the Year award, for "Sorry Seems to Be the Hardest Word." The winners were Shenandoah and Alison Krauss for "Somewhere in the Vicinity of the Heart."

Track listing
 "In the Jailhouse Now" (Jimmie Rodgers) – 3:11
 "When She Smiled at Him" (Joanie Beeson, Michael Johnson) – 3:06
 "Forget About It" (R. L. Kass) – 4:22
 "Wives Don't Like Old Girlfriends" (Shane Fontayne, Randy VanWarmer) – 4:12
 "Sorry Seems to Be the Hardest Word" (Elton John, Bernie Taupin) – 3:59
 "Two Shades of Blue" (Deborah Allen, Bobby Braddock, Rafe Van Hoy) – 3:25
 "One More for the Road" (Atkins, Bogguss, Doug Crider) – 4:26
 "I Still Miss Someone" (Johnny Cash, Roy Cash Jr.) – 3:40
 "You Bring Out the Best in Me" (Bogguss, Crider, Steve Dorff) – 3:34
 "This Is the Beginning" (Pat Donohue) – 5:12

Personnel

Musicians
Suzy Bogguss – lead vocals
Chet Atkins – lead vocals, background vocals, electric guitar, acoustic guitar
Brent Rowan – acoustic guitar, electric guitar
Pat Bergeson – acoustic guitar, harmonica
 Flaco Jiménez – concertina
R. L. Kass – acoustic guitar
Mark O'Connor – fiddle
Matt Rollings – piano
Mike Lawler – synthesizer
Leland Sklar, Roy Huskey, Jr., Glenn Worf – bass guitar
Carlos Vega, Harry Stinson – drums
Tom Roady – percussion
Nashville String Machine – strings
Harry Stinson, Gerald Boyd, Beth Nielsen Chapman, Sons of the San Joaquin, Vince Gill, Jack Hanna, Carl Atkins, Joe Hanna, Lon Hanna – background vocals

Production
Producer(s): John Guess, Suzy Bogguss
Engineer: Derek Bason, John Guess, Doug Crider
Assistant Engineer: Derek Bason, John Thomas II
Mixing: John Guess
Mixing Assistant: Derek Bason
Mastering: Glenn Meadows
Conductor, String Arrangements: David Campbell
Concert Master: Carl Gorodetzky
Production Coordination: Janie West
Design: Jerry Joyner
Photography: Frank Ockenfels
Stylist: Claudia Fowler
Hair Stylist: Earl Cox
Make-Up: Mary Beth Felts
Distributor: EMI Music Dist.
Studio: Emerald Sound and Sound Stage, Nashville, TN.

Chart performance

Album

Singles

Release history

External links
 Amazon.com review
 Rate Your Music review

1994 albums
Suzy Bogguss albums
Chet Atkins albums
Liberty Records albums
Collaborative albums